Carmen Montejo (born María Teresa Sánchez González; May 26, 1925 – February 25, 2013) was a Cuban actress.

Biography
Real name: María Teresa Sánchez González. 
Montejo started her career in radio as a child at the age of 6 in Cuba in a show titled Abuelita Cata transmitted on CMOX. While still in Cuba, she was nicknamed "Muñeca" Sánchez in theatre and because of her golden curls as the Cuban Shirley Temple. She began acting studies in 1939 at Universidad de La Habana under Ludwing Shayovich. After concluding her college studies, her parents offered her a trip to the United States, but instead she chose to go to Mexico for two months.

After arriving in Mexico, she obtained a job in radio claiming to be a famous star in Cuba with a role in the radionovela El diario de Susana Galván. In 1943, she obtained a role in the film Resurrección, directed by Gilberto Martínez Solares, and then Chano Ureta changed her professional name to "Carmen Montejo" when she told him she lived across the Hotel Montejo.

In Venezuela, she participated in one of the first films shot in that country titled Páramo (1954). In theater, she obtained the role of Adela in the 1946 production of The House of Bernarda Alba of Federico García Lorca. She co-starred with Virginia Fábregas and was directed by Ricardo Mondragón at the Palacio de Bellas Artes. She has also participated in Who's Afraid of Virginia Woolf? and The Trojans.

In television, she has performed roles in many telenovelas as well as the sitcom Tres Generaciones with Angélica María and Sasha Sokol in the 1980s.

For her work in television, films and theatre, Montejo was inducted into the Paseo de las Luminarias.

Death
Carmen Montejo died on February 25, 2013, in Mexico City. She was 87.

Theater

 Los Efectos de los Rayos Gamma
 Los Zorros
 Las Troyanas
 Who's Afraid of Virginia Woolf?
 The House of Bernarda Alba (1946)

Telenovelas

Films

Television
 Mujer, casos de la vida real (2002, episode "Un viejo amor") as Margarita
 Tres Generaciones (1989)

References

External links

 

1925 births
2013 deaths
People from Pinar del Río
Cuban emigrants to Mexico
Naturalized citizens of Mexico
Mexican film actresses
Mexican radio actresses
Mexican stage actresses
Mexican telenovela actresses
Mexican television actresses
Mexican voice actresses
Golden Age of Mexican cinema
Ariel Award winners
Golden Ariel Award winners